For a Few Dollars Less is a 1966 Italian comedy film, a parody of Sergio Leone's For a Few Dollars More (the second film of his Dollars Trilogy), directed by Mario Mattoli and starring Lando Buzzanca. It was Mattoli's final film. The film was co-written by the brothers Bruno Corbucci and Sergio Corbucci.

Cast
 Lando Buzzanca as Bill
 Raimondo Vianello as Frank
 Elio Pandolfi as Il messicano
 Gloria Paul as Juanita
 Lucia Modugno as Sally
 Angela Luce as La donna del Ranch
 Luigi Pavese as Il padre del messicano
 Carlo Pisacane as Calamity John
 Calisto Calisti as Lo sceriffo
 Pietro Tordi as Black
 Adalberto Rossetti as Un bandito
 Tony Renis as Little Joe
 Valeria Ciangottini as Jane

References

External links

1966 films
1966 comedy films
1960s parody films
1960s Western (genre) comedy films
Italian parody films
1960s Italian-language films
Spaghetti Western films
Films directed by Mario Mattoli
Films scored by Marcello Giombini
1960s Italian films